Saintes-Maries-de-la-Mer (lit.: "Saint Marys of the Sea"; Provençal Occitan: Li Santi Mario de la Mar) is the capital of the Camargue (Provençal Occitan Camarga) in the south of France. It is a commune in the Bouches-du-Rhône department by the Mediterranean Sea. Its population is 2,144 (2019), though it can swell to 500,000 during the summer holidays. It covers the second-largest area of all communes in Metropolitan France, smaller only than that of neighbouring Arles.

Geography
The town is situated in the Rhône river delta, about 1 km east of the mouth of the Petit Rhône distributary. The commune comprises alluvial land and marshland, and includes the Étang de Vaccarès, a large lagoon. The main industry is tourism. Agriculture is also significant, and ranchers have raised horses and cattle unique to the Camargue; some of the bulls are used for bull-fighting and for the course camarguaise. There is bus service to Arles, 38 km away.

History
The village was noted as Ra (see below) in the 4th century AD by the Roman geographer Rufus Festus Avienus. In the 6th century, the archbishopric of Arles was active and created a monastery or church in the town, named St. Mary, a favorite of the fishermen. The village became known as Notre-Dame-de-Ratis (Our Lady of the Boat - Râ being used in ratis, or boat) in reference to the three Marys arriving by boat. (Droit, 1963, 19). The name was later changed to Notre-Dame-de-la-Mer (Our Lady of the Sea, a synonym for the Virgin Mary).

The current Church of the Saintes Maries de la Mer was built from the 9th to the 12th century, as a fortress and a refuge. It can be seen from 10 km away. It has a fresh water well inside, for when the villagers had to take shelter from raiders. In the 9th century, the town suffered raids from the Mediterranean Sea by the Vikings and later from the Saracens. In the 15th century, someone discovered the relics of Mary of Clopas and Mary Salome, who were said to have arrived there by sea (together with Mary Magdalene). The 500th anniversary of this event was celebrated in the 20th century by Pope John XXIII.

In 1720, the town was spared by the plague. During the anti-clerical fervor of the French Revolution, the church was partially destroyed and the stones recycled.

In 1838, the town was renamed Saintes-Maries-de-la-Mer, after the three Maries of its Catholic and local history.  Shortly afterward, the pilgrimage (see below) was instituted. A narrow-gauge railway line to Arles operated from 1892 until 1953.

In 1888, Van Gogh made several paintings of the seascape and the town.  In the early 20th century, the town was a literary and artistic center, with visits inter alios from such figures as American writer Ernest Hemingway and Spanish painter Picasso. The vicinity was used as a setting for various films.

Since the second half of the 20th century, the population has increased. Retired people and holiday accommodation largely supplanted the fishermen and farmers, with a corresponding political shift to the right in elections.

Religion

Saintes-Maries-de-la-Mer, an ancient town in the marshes of the Camargue, where the Rhône meets the Mediterranean Sea, is named after The Three Marys — in French, Marie Madeleine, Marie Salomé and Marie de Cléophas — a group of three women closely linked to Jesus, as according to the gospels they came to his sepulchre three days after the Crucifixion and were the first witnesses of his Resurrection. The designation "de-la-Mer" (of the sea) derives from a medieval tradition that after Jesus' Resurrection, The Three Marys escaped the Christian persecution in Palestine and travelled across the sea by boat, living in the Camargue the rest of their lives and helping to bring Christianity to France.

The three saints Mary Magdalene, Mary Salome and Mary of Clopas are believed to be the women who were the first witnesses to the empty tomb at the resurrection of Jesus. After the Crucifixion of Jesus, the Marys were said to set sail from Alexandria, Egypt with their uncle Joseph of Arimathea.  According to a longstanding French legend, they either sailed to or were cast adrift - arriving off the coast of what is now France, at "a sort of fortress named Oppidum-Râ". The location became known as "Our Lady of the Boat" - Râ being used in ratis, or boat). The name was later changed to Notre-Dame-de-la-Mer. In 1838, it was changed to Les Saintes-Maries-de-la-Mer.

Today, aside from being a working class summer beach destination with a picturesque Romanesque fortress-church, Church of the Saintes Maries de la Mer, Saintes-Maries-de-la-Mer is known in France for the celebrations it holds for each Mary's feast, in May and October. The feast days in May draw large numbers of Roma  Catholics and others from France and beyond — typically 25,000-40,000 people all together — to the town for a week. The high points at that feast include a ritual when a painted reliquary chest, said to contain the bones of the Saintes Maries, is ceremoniously lowered from its high perch to the altar for veneration, and when the crypt is left open so that the statue of another figure, the Roma's own Saint Sarah, can be honored. On successive days, Romas and a large crowd process statues of Sara and the Saintes Maries from the church to the beach, carrying them right into the sea.

The Roma pilgrimage for the dark-skinned Saint Sara is said to have possibly been the Egyptian servant of the three Marys. In another version, Sara was a local woman who welcomed the three Marys on their arrival. A statue of Sarah is in the crypt of the church, which also encloses a 4th-century BC taurobolic altar once dedicated to the cult of the Indo-Iranian god  Mithras, although a likely Celtic origin is claimed.

Population

Sport

 Arènes des Saintes Maries de la Mer is a prominent bullfighting ring, staging festivals throughout the summer.
 The windsurfing Canal (Canal de Vitesse)  where 8 Outright World Sailing Speed Records were set between 1988 and 2009 is on the outskirts of the town. The first by British speed windsurfer Erik Beale  40.48 knots and last by French  windsurfing legend Antoine Albeau  at 49.09 in 2009.

Notable figures
 Vincent van Gogh painted several paintings here, including Street in Saintes-Maries in 1888.
 Hermann-Paul died here in 1940, two days before the French capitulation to Germany in the Battle of France.
 Tori Amos wrote a song, "Marys of the Sea", inspired by Saintes-Maries-de-la-Mer, most notably Mary Magdalene.
 Mick Softley wrote a song called "Just Flew In On A Jet Plane," featured on his Sunrise/Streetsinger album, in which he refers to flying "from Montpelier, from the festival of gypsies, at Les Saintes-Maries-de-la-Mer, and in a church in the village, 1000 candles glow, for Magdalene of the sea, from 2000 years ago".
 Bob Dylan claimed to have composed the song "One more cup of coffee," included on his album Desire while visiting the Roma festival in 1975 on his 34th birthday.
 Czon the Swedish artist did a portrait of Sara La Kali here 2018.
 CocoRosie's Sierra and Bianca Casady have created several albums at their mother's farm in Saintes-Maries-de-la-Mer.

See also
 Communes of the Bouches-du-Rhône department
 Bac du Sauvage
 Myrrhbearers

References

External links

 Tourism office website
 CatholicsandCultures website

Christian pilgrimages
Communes of Bouches-du-Rhône
Romani religion
Romani in France
Populated coastal places in France
The Three Marys